Golden Public School is a school in Gajsinghpur, Sri Ganganagar district, Rajasthan.

Dr Pawanjeet Singh started this institution with Mrs Riturajkaur. This institution was started with 50 students and has provided several doctors, engineers, law graduates, charted accountants, teachers and good citizens to our society. This is  a coeducational, CBSE affiliated senior secondary school, which was opened in 2002 under the guidance of Mrs. Riturajkaur. In 2016 this school got minority status as a Sikh minority school and the school is running as day scholar basis with medium of teaching in English.

External links
 http://www.goldenpublicschool.co.in/

Schools in Rajasthan
Education in Sri Ganganagar district
Educational institutions established in 2002
2002 establishments in Rajasthan